Shenqiornis is a bird genus of the Enantiornithes. It was found in the Qiaotou Member of the Huajiying Formation of Hebei Province, China, and is therefore of uncertain age. The Qiaotou Member may correlate with the more well-known Early Cretaceous Yixian Formation, and so probably is dated to the Aptian, around 122 million years ago.

The type species Shenqiornis mengi was in 2010 named and described by Wang Xuri, Jingmai O'Connor, Zhao Bo, Luis María Chiappe, Gao Chunling and Cheng Xiaodong. The generic name combines a reference to Shenzhou 7 with a Greek ornis, "bird". The specific name honours Meng Qingjin, the former director of the Dalian Natural History Museum. The holotype is DNHM D2950-2951, a plate and counterplate containing a largely complete skeleton of a subaldult.

References

Enantiornitheans
Early Cretaceous birds of Asia
Fossil taxa described in 2010